Eugene Weingand (1 April 1934 – 30 November 1986) was an American actor,  misleadingly known and credited as Peter Lorre Jr.

Biography

Weingand was born in Karlsruhe, Germany as Eugen Weingand and immigrated to the US at age of 20. Because of his resemblance to Peter Lorre he began calling himself Peter Lorie Jr. (sic). In 1963 he applied to have his name legally changed to Peter Lorie Jr., but Peter Lorre objected, as did American International Pictures, which had Lorre under contract. After a hearing in which the judge denied Weingand's petition, by deciding he was merely trying to cash in on the name, Weingand was barred from using the name Peter Lorie Jr. without Lorre's permission. After Lorre's death a few months later, Weingand began calling himself Peter Lorre Jr. and claimed to be the son of the actor. Under this name, he made a handful of film and TV appearances in the 1960s and 70s. including The Cat Creature, scripted by Robert Bloch. He had an uncredited appearance in the Alfred Hitchcock movie Torn Curtain as a taxi driver.

He also was the voice of Booberry in a breakfast cereal television advertisement for the breakfast cereal of the same name.

He died in Houston, Texas, USA.

Filmography

References

1934 births
1986 deaths
American male television actors
Actors from Karlsruhe
German emigrants to the United States
20th-century American male actors
American male film actors